Jason Fischer is a speculative fiction writer from South Australia, Australia. He is predominantly recognised as a writer in the science fiction, fantasy and horror genres.

Fischer's stories have appeared in a number of publications including Beneath Ceaseless Skies, On Spec, Review of Australian Fiction, Aurealis and Andromeda Spaceways Inflight Magazine. His story "For Want of a Jesusman" was reprinted in the Year's Best Australian Science Fiction and Fantasy Vol 5, edited by Bill Congreve. His zombie apocalypse novel "Quiver" was published in 2012 by Black House Comics, and his first short story collection "Everything is a Graveyard" was published by Ticonderoga Publications in 2013.

Fischer won the inaugural 2015 Aurealis Award for the Best Fantasy Novella, and was 1st Place Winner, Writers of the Future, 2nd Quarter 2009. He has been nominated for the Ditmar Award four times.

References

External links

Living people
Australian fantasy writers
Australian male short story writers
Australian horror writers
Public servants of South Australia
Writers from Adelaide
Year of birth missing (living people)